Norborne Berkeley may refer to:

 Norborne Berkeley, 4th Baron Botetourt (c. 1717–1770), British courtier, member of parliament, and royal governor of the colony of Virginia
 Norborne Berkeley (American football) (1891–1964), American football player and director of the Bethlehem Steel Company
 Norborne Berkeley (soldier) (1824–1911), Virginia planter, politician and Confederate Army officer